The office of the Minister of State for Standards and Services is a department of the Albanian Government that in cooperation with other responsible institutions, drafts, coordinates and implements state policies aimed at high standards of public services, which improve the lives of Albanian citizens. These policies facilitate the provision of public services by ensuring their quality, affordability and increase effectiveness which guarantee access to all citizens who receive public services. The current minister is Milva Ekonomi.

References

Standards and Services